The Janskerk or St. John's Church is a former church in the Dutch city of Haarlem. Today it houses the North Holland Archives (Noord-Hollands archief).

History
Gerard van Tetrode donated land in 1310 in the centre of Haarlem to build St. John's monastery. Later the St. Barbara gasthuis was founded in 1435 by the Hugo van Assendelft, priest of the St. John's monastery, on the south side of this area. The monastery's church and the old Gasthuis doorway are the only parts of the large complex that still exist today. It was a commandry of the Knights of Saint John and is the oldest church in Haarlem after the St. Bavochurch. The order of St. John was disbanded after the Protestant Reformation and the church reverted to the state in 1625. The Haarlem council sold most of the monastery's land, and much of the art during the following years, which added considerably to the wealth of the city.

In 1936 it became the location of the Haarlem Archives, and it is now the location for the North Holland Archives.

Though many objects from the church were removed from the city by the Order of St. John before the iconoclasm, many have also survived and are in the collection of the Frans Hals Museum or the Museum Catharijneconvent in Utrecht (which contains the former collection of the Haarlem Bishop museum).

References

External links
  website of the North Holland Archives

Churches in Haarlem
Rijksmonuments in Haarlem